2011–12 Kit Premier League is the 2011–12 season of Kit Premier League.

Table

References

Season at soccerway.com

Sri Lanka Football Premier League seasons
1
Sri Lanka